Lena & Michel is a 1975 album by Lena Horne, arranged by Michel Legrand. This album was recorded at the RCA Studios, New York in February 1975. Re-issued on CD in 2002 by BMG Japan and in 2010 by Sony UK.

Track listing
 "I Will Wait for You (Je Ne Pourrai Jamais Vivre Sans Toi)" (Jacques Demy, Norman Gimbel, Michel Legrand) – 3:47
 "I Got a Name" (Charles Fox, Gimbel) – 3:52
 "Nobody Knows" (Alan and Marilyn Bergman, Legrand) – 3:39
 "Being a Woman" (Larry Grossman, Hal Hackaday) – 3:22
 "Let Me Be Your Mirror" (Hal David, Legrand) – 2:18
 "Loneliness" (Kenny Ascher, Paul Williams) – 3:50
 "Time in a Bottle" (Jim Croce) – 3:48
 "Everything That Happens to You, Happens to Me" (David, Legrand) – 2:53
 "Sad Song" (Ascher, Williams) – 4:02
 "I've Been Starting Tomorrow All of My Life" (David, Legrand) – 2:22
 "Thank You Love" (Robert Freedman) – 3:58
 "One at a Time" (Alan and Marilyn Bergman) – 3:16

Personnel

Performance
Lena Horne - vocals
The Howard Roberts Chorale - vocals
Michel Legrand - Arranger
Richard Tee - Organ
Paul Griffin - Piano
Joe Beck, Cornell Dupree - Guitar
Ron Carter - Bass
Grady Tate - drums
Ralph MacDonald - percussion
Alan Rubin, Joe Newman, Jon Faddis, Marvin Stamm, Thad Jones - trumpet
David Nadien, Max Pollikoff, Paul Gershman, Sanford Allen - violin
Seymour Barab - cello
Phil Bodner - oboe
Ray Beckenstein - flute
Emile Charlap - contractor
Mike Moran - engineer
Harold Wheeler, Sherman Sneed - associate producers

References

1975 albums
Lena Horne albums
Albums arranged by Michel Legrand
Albums produced by Nat Shapiro
RCA Records albums